The foot ( feet), standard symbol: ft, is a unit of length in the British imperial and United States customary systems of measurement. The prime symbol, is a customarily used alternative symbol. In both customary and imperial units, one foot comprises 12 inches and one yard comprises three feet.

Historically the "foot" was a part of many local systems of units, including the Greek, Roman, Chinese, French, and English systems. It varied in length from country to country, from city to city, and sometimes from trade to trade. Its length was usually between 250 mm and 335 mm and was generally, but not always, subdivided into 12 inches or 16 digits.

The United States is the only industrialized nation that uses the international foot in preference to the meter in its commercial, engineering, and standards activities. The foot is legally recognized in the United Kingdom; road signs must use imperial units (however, distances on road signs are always marked in miles or yards, not feet), while its usage is widespread among the British public as a measurement of height. The foot is recognized as an alternative expression of length in Canada officially defined as a unit derived from the meter although both the U.K. and Canada have partially metricated their units of measurement. The measurement of altitude in international aviation (the flight level unit) is one of the few areas where the foot is used outside the English-speaking world.

The length of the international foot corresponds to a human foot with shoe size of 13 (UK), 14 (US male), 15.5 (US female) or 48 (EU sizing).

Historical origin

Historically, the human body has been used to provide the basis for units of length.

Archaeologists believe that, in the past, the people of Egypt, India, and Mesopotamia preferred the cubit, while the people of Rome, Greece, and China preferred the foot. Under the Harappan linear measures, Indus cities during the Bronze Age used a foot of  333.5 mm (13.2 in) and a cubit of 528.3 mm (20.8 in).

(In reality, this foot predated Drusus.)

Originally both the Greeks and the Romans subdivided the foot into 16 digits, but in later years, the Romans also subdivided the foot into 12  (from which both the English words "inch" and "ounce" are derived).

After the fall of the Roman Empire, some Roman traditions were continued but others fell into disuse. In AD 790 Charlemagne attempted to reform the units of measure in his domains.

The procedure for verification of the foot as described in the 16th century posthumously published work by Jacob Köbel in his book  is:

England

The Neolithic long foot, first proposed by archeologists Mike Parker Pearson and Andrew Chamberlain, is based upon calculations from surveys of Phase 1 elements at Stonehenge. They found that the underlying diameters of the stone circles had been consistently laid out using  multiples of a base unit amounting to 30 long feet, which they calculated to be 1.056 of a modern international foot (thus 12.672 inches or 0.3219 m). Furthermore, this unit is identifiable in the dimensions of some stone lintels at the site and in the diameter of the "southern circle"  at nearby Durrington Walls. Evidence that this unit was in widespread use across southern Britain is available from the Folkton Drums from  Yorkshire (neolithic artifacts, made from chalk, with circumferences that exactly divide as integers into ten long feet) and a similar object, the Lavant drum, excavated at Lavant, Sussex, again with a circumference divisible as a whole number into ten long feet.

The measures of Iron Age Britain are uncertain and proposed reconstructions such as the Megalithic Yard are controversial. Later Welsh legend credited Dyfnwal Moelmud with the establishment of their units, including a foot of 9 inches.

Roman units were introduced following their invasion in AD 43. Following the Roman withdrawal and Saxon invasions, the Roman foot continued to be used in the construction crafts while the Belgic foot was used for land measurement. Both the Welsh and Belgic feet seem to have been based on multiples of the barleycorn, but by as early as 950 the English kings seem to have (ineffectually) ordered measures to be based upon an iron yardstick at Winchester and then London. Henry I was said to have ordered a new standard to be based upon the length of his own arm and, by the  Act concerning the Composition of Yards and Perches traditionally credited to Edward I or II, the statute foot was a different measure, exactly  of the old (Belgic) foot. The barleycorn, inch, ell, and yard were likewise shrunk, while rods and furlongs remained the same. The ambiguity over the state of the mile was resolved by the 1593 Act against Converting of Great Houses into Several Tenements and for Restraint of Inmates and Inclosures in and near about the City of London and Westminster, which codified the statute mile as comprising 5,280 feet. The differences among the various physical standard yards around the world, revealed by increasingly powerful microscopes, eventually led to the 1959 adoption of the international foot defined in terms of the meter.

Definition

International foot
The international yard and pound agreement of July 1959 defined the length of the international yard in the United States and countries of the Commonwealth of Nations as exactly 0.9144 meters. Consequently, since a foot is one third of a yard, the international foot is defined to be equal to exactly 0.3048 meters. This was 2 ppm shorter than the previous U.S. definition and 1.7 ppm longer than the previous British definition.

The 1959 agreement concluded a series of step-by-step events, set off in particular by the British Standards Institution's adoption of a scientific standard inch of 25.4 millimetres in 1930.

Symbol
The IEEE standard symbol for a foot is "ft". In some cases, the foot is denoted by a prime, often approximated by an apostrophe, and the inch by a double prime; for example, 2feet 4 inches is sometimes denoted as 2′4″.

Imperial units 
In Imperial units, the foot was defined as  yard, with the yard being realized as a physical standard (separate from the standard meter). The yard standards of the different Commonwealth countries were periodically compared with one another.

The UK adopted the international yard for all purposes through the Weights and Measures Act 1963, effective January 1, 1964.

Survey foot
When the international foot was defined in 1959, a great deal of survey data was already available based on the former definitions, especially in the United States and in India. The small difference between the survey foot and the international foot would not be detectable on a survey of a small parcel, but becomes significant for mapping, or when the state plane coordinate system (SPCS) is used in the US, because the origin of the system may be hundreds of thousands of feet (hundreds of miles) from the point of interest. Hence the previous definitions continued to be used for surveying in the United States and India for many years, and are denoted survey feet to distinguish them from the international foot. The United Kingdom was unaffected by this problem, as the retriangulation of Great Britain (1936–62) had been done in meters.

U.S. survey foot
In the United States, the foot was defined as 12 inches, with the inch being defined by the Mendenhall Order of 1893 as 39.37 inches = 1 m (making a US foot exactly meters, approximately ). Out of 50 states and six other jurisdictions, 40 have legislated that surveying measures should be based on the U.S. survey foot, six have legislated that they be made on the basis of the international foot, and ten have not specified.

State legislation is also important for determining the conversion factor to be used for everyday land surveying and real estate transactions, although the difference (two parts per million) is of no practical significance given the precision of normal surveying measurements over short distances (usually much less than a mile).

The National Institute of Standards and Technology, National Geodetic Survey, and the United States Department of Commerce are phasing out the US survey foot beginning in 2023. However, its relevance may persist, as the Federal Register Notice says:

"The date of December 31, 2022, was selected to accompany the modernization of the National Spatial Reference System (NSRS) by NOAA's National Geodetic Survey (NGS). The reason for associating the deprecation of the U.S. survey foot with the modernization of the NSRS is that the biggest impact of the uniform adoption of the international foot will be for users of the NSRS, due to very large coordinate values currently given in U.S. survey feet in many areas of the U.S. Impacts related to the change to international feet will be minimized if a transition occurs concurrently with others changes in the NSRS."

"The difference will have no effect on users of the existing NSRS (National Spatial Reference System), because NGS (NOAA's National Geodetic Survey) will continue to support the U.S. survey foot for components of the NSRS where it is used now and in the past. In other words, to minimize disruption in the use of U.S. survey foot for existing NSRS coordinate systems, the change will apply only to the modernized NSRS."

Indian survey foot
The Indian survey foot is defined as exactly , presumably derived from a measurement of the previous Indian standard of the yard. The current National Topographic Database of the Survey of India is based on the metric WGS-84 datum, which is also used by the Global Positioning System.

Historical use

Metric foot

An ISO 2848 measure of 3 basic modules (30 cm) is called a "metric foot", but there were earlier distinct definitions of a metric foot during metrication in France and Germany.

France

In 1799 the meter became the official unit of length in France. This was not fully enforced, and in 1812 Napoleon introduced the system of mesures usuelles which restored the traditional French measurements in the retail trade, but redefined them in terms of metric units. The foot, or pied métrique, was defined as one third of a meter. This unit continued in use until 1837.

Germany

In southwestern Germany in 1806, the Confederation of the Rhine was founded and three different reformed feet were defined, all of which were based on the metric system:
In Hesse, the Fuß (foot) was redefined as 25 cm.
In Baden, the Fuß was redefined as 30 cm.
In the Palatinate, the Fuß was redefined as being  cm (as in France).

Other obsolete feet
Lists of conversion factors between the various units of measure were given in many European reference works including:
Traité, Paris – 1769
Palaiseau – Bordeaux: 1816 
de Gelder, Amsterdam and The Hague – 1824
Horace, Brussels – 1840
Noback & Noback (2 volumes), Leipzig – 1851
Bruhns, Leipzig – 1881

Many of these standards were peculiar to a particular city, especially in Germany (which, before German Unification in 1871, consisted of many kingdoms, principalities, free cities and so on). In many cases the length of the unit was not uniquely fixed: for example, the English foot was stated as 11 pouces 2.6 lignes (French inches and lines) by Picard, 11 pouces 3.11 lignes by Maskelyne and 11 pouces 3 lignes by D'Alembert.

Most of the various feet in this list ceased to be used when the countries adopted the metric system. The Netherlands and modern Belgium adopted the metric system in 1817, having used the mesures usuelles under Napoleon and the newly formed German Empire adopted the metric system in 1871.

The palm (typically 200 mm to 280 mm) was used in many Mediterranean cities instead of the foot. Horace Doursther, whose reference was published in Belgium which had the smallest foot measurements, grouped both units together, while J.F.G. Palaiseau devoted three chapters to units of length: one for linear measures (palms and feet); one for cloth measures (ells); and one for distances traveled (miles and leagues).

Obsolete feet details
In the table below, arbitrary cut-off points of 270 mm and 350 mm have been chosen.

Notes

Present day uses

International ISO-standard and other intermodal shipping containers 
International Standards Organisation (ISO)-defined intermodal containers for efficient global freight/cargo shipping, were defined using feet rather than meters for their leading outside (corner) dimensions. All ISO-standard containers to this day are eight feet wide, and their outer heights and lengths are also primarily defined in, or derived from feet. 
Quantities of global shipping containers are still primarily counted in Twenty-foot Equivalent Units, or TEUs.

Aviation
Everyday global (civilian) air traffic / aviation continues to be controlled in flight levels (flying altitudes) separated by thousands of feet (although typically read out in hundreds - e.g. flight level 330 actually means 33,000 feet, or about 10 kilometres in altitude).

Dimension
In measurement, the term "linear foot" (sometimes incorrectly referred to as "lineal foot") refers to the number of feet in a length of material (such as lumber or fabric) without regard to the width; it is used to distinguish from surface area in square foot.

See also
 Anthropic units
 History of measurement
 International System of Units
 Korean units of measurement
 Mermin's foot
 Pous
 Systems of measurement

Notes

References

Customary units of measurement in the United States
Human-based units of measurement
Imperial units
Units of length